Krueppel-like factor 12 is a protein that in humans is encoded by the KLF12 gene.

Activator protein-2 alpha (AP-2 alpha) is a developmentally-regulated transcription factor and important regulator of gene expression during vertebrate development and carcinogenesis. The protein encoded by this gene is a member of the Kruppel-like zinc finger protein family and can repress expression of the AP-2 alpha gene by binding to a specific site in the AP-2 alpha gene promoter. Repression by the encoded protein requires binding with a corepressor, CtBP1. Two transcript variants encoding different isoforms have been found for this gene.

See also
 Kruppel-like factors

References

Further reading

External links 
 

Transcription factors